Buffalo Seminary (SEM) is an independent, private, college preparatory day and boarding school for girls in Buffalo, New York, United States. SEM is secular and non-uniform.

Accreditations and memberships 
SEM is an accredited member of the National Association of Independent Schools (NAIS), the New York State Association of Independent Schools (NYSAIS), The Association of Boarding Schools (TABS), the Small Boarding School Association (SBSA), the National Coalition of Girls' Schools (NCGS) and Online School for Girls (OSG). As an independent school, SEM is not confined by the guidelines established by the New York State Board of Regents. SEM is a Committed Steinway Select School. As a nonprofit, SEM is rated Gold level by Guidestar.

History 
Founded in 1851, SEM is among the oldest schools for girls in the United States - it is the sixth oldest. It is Western New York's oldest school for boys or girls; in New York State, including New York City, only one girls' school is older. The school was originally named The Buffalo Female Academy and has maintained an all-female student body. Its original, unflagging and prescient mission was to provide an exceptional education for young women, to prepare them to engage productively with the world. Originally, it offered education for young girls from kindergarten through sophomore year in college and had boarding. In 1889, the school adopted its current name, Buffalo Seminary. In the 19th century, schools for girls were commonly called "academies," and interestingly, many were also renamed to seminary.

Graduates of SEM founded the Twentieth Century Club in the late 1800s. one of the oldest private women's clubs in the United States, which is on the National Register of Historic Places.

The school changed its policy in 1899 to teach only grades 9 through 12 after merging with the Elmwood School. In 1908, the school moved from its initial founding address on Johnson Park to the current address on Bidwell Parkway, and was listed on the National Register of Historic Places in 2011. In 2008 SEM reestablished boarding which has expanded into a campus of five renovated historic homes (Douglass House, Lipke House, Niscah House, Oishei House, and Wendt House) next to the school building, centered by the private Magavern-Sutton Courtyard, and staffed by faculty "parents." Since adding the residential program, American girls and girls from all over the world have lived and learned at SEM: Argentina, Australia,  Bahamas, Bermuda, Canada, Colombia, China, France, Germany, Guatemala, Japan, Kenya, S.Korea, and Vietnam have resided in the houses.

Facilities 
SEM's school building is located at 205 Bidwell Parkway. It was designed by Boston architect George F. Newton, who also designed the Hellenic Orthodox Church of the Annunciation.  It was built in 1908, in the Tudor Revival style, the school's building features buttresses, terra cotta sculptures, Gothic style arches, and limestone ornamentation. The interior of the building features a library with a fireplace, traditional chapel for all-school gatherings (while called "chapel," it is more an auditorium - the school is not religious), numerous Harkness table classrooms, skylit art studio with a digital printer, science and technology labs including a virtual reality (VR) lab, and three NAO robots. A contemporary Performing Arts Center (black box theater), darkroom, squash courts, courtyard, fitness and erg rooms ensure an outstanding school experience. Additionally, the building features the West-Chester Hall, used for meetings and classes. SEM's campus includes five historic homes Douglass, Lipke, Niscah, Oishei, and Wendt Houses renovated for faculty and student residences, and Larkin Field at 101 Lincoln Parkway Larkin Field where SEM's Red-Tailed Hawks play soccer, lacrosse, and field hockey. SEM was one of the founding schools of the Buffalo Scholastic Rowing Association (BSRA), our crew team's home. SEM's sailing team is based at the Buffalo Yacht Club.

SEM launched a capital campaign "Remarkable Opportunities - Campaign for SEM" in the spring of 2015 which when it closed June 30, 2016, with gift commitments of $9.2 million, surpassing its goal of $8.5 million. One of the campaign's goals was to build the Magavern-Sutton Courtyard to connect the five SEM student and faculty houses with the school building. The private courtyard opened for the 2016-17 school year.  It is located in the Elmwood Historic District–East.

Sports 
The 14 teams at Buffalo Seminary - Red-Tailed Hawks - are part of the Monsignor Martin High School Athletic Association (MMHSA) for a number of sports, NYSAIS (field hockey), ISSA (sailing), BSRA and US Squash (squash). The students compete with other schools in the MMHSAA as well as other local and regional high schools in various sports. The school offers three seasons of sports in which the girls may participate at the Varsity team level: crew, cross country, basketball, bowling (varsity and junior varsity), fencing, field hockey, golf, lacrosse, indoor track, sailing, swimming, squash, and tennis. Notably, SEM regularly sends boats to the US National Scholastic Rowing Championships in Camden, NJ and the Head of Charles in Boston. 2015 was a banner year for SEM teams: SEM Squash won the US Squash Division V Championship; SEM Bowling won the MMA Championship; SEM Tennis was the undefeated winner of the MMHSAA Division ll Championship, won the MMHSAA Doubles Championship, and came in 2d and 3d in the MMHSAA singles championship. In the winter of 2016 SEM won its division again at the US Squash nationals and in the spring won the MMHSAA tennis championship in singles and doubles. In the fall of 2016 SEM won the MMHSAA soccer championship (B class), and the winter of 2017 won the US Squash Division V Championship for the third time. In 2018 Soccer won the MMHSAA championship again. In 2019 SEM won the MMHSAA swimming championship for the first time in at least a decade.

The teams are named the Red-Tailed Hawks for a bird commonly spotted in Western New York, and soaring over SEM's athletic field, Larkin Field.

Traditions 
Honor Code: "One choice. Honor. Three advantages: respect, integrity and trust." Each student, faculty and staff member literally signs this Academic and Social Honor Code at the beginning of the school year. The Code is then prominently set upon an easel for all to see throughout the year. Academic honor requires respect for intellectual and artistic property. "I pledge my honor that I have neither given nor received assistance," is written and signed by students on all class tests, papers, examinations, and other work which a faculty member designates as an honor assignment. Social Honor requires consideration for others, honesty in all matters, courtesy, and respect for differences.

Harkness Learning: SEM has six Harkness classrooms used primarily by the English and history departments. These classrooms are centered on a Harkness table - a large, wood, oval table where which students gather around to learn collaboratively. At a Harkness table teachers facilitate and mediate topics and discussion, no student is not seen, and everyone has the duty and opportunity to speak.

Morning Meeting: Every morning the entire school assembles for "morning meeting."  While other high schools may begin their day with an assigned homeroom for students, at SEM, all students gather in the chapel first. Morning meeting is led by the president of the School Government Association, and typically opens with the entire student and faculty body singing SEM's alma mater or the anthem "Jerusalem." Announcements and awards are then made by students and faculty. Throughout the year, senior class students make their formal, required "Senior Presentation," at morning meeting - they are often accompanied by media or a live musical performance.

Hornet/Jacket: One of the school's prominent school life traditions is the Hornet and Jacket competition. Created by legendary headmistress L. Gertrude Angell, the students of Buffalo Seminary were organized into these two teams so girls could compete amicably. Today, after admission to the school students are sorted into either team on the festival-like Hornet/Jacket Day. Faculty too is either Hornet or Jacket. Family members are what their first SEM student was - it is a legacy. Sisters, mothers, aunts, and grandmothers are always the same team. Throughout the year, academic, and festive (often holiday themed) contests are held and the teams compete against the other. Points are accrued and awarded to the winning team, and at the close of the school year, the points are tallied, and the winning team is engraved into the "Hornet-Jacket Cup."

All-Girl Theatre Productions: Girls play all the parts in SEM's two main theatrical productions (fall and spring) and they work as the production, lighting, and costume crews. Most recently: Romeo & Juliet (Fall 2010), I Never Saw Another Butterfly (Spring 2011), Mary Zimmerman's The Odyssey (Fall 2011), Chamber Music (Spring 2012), The Illusion (Fall 2012), A Conference of Birds (Fall 2013), Plays for Days (Spring 2013), Gerald Sibleyras/Tom Stoppard's Heroes (Spring 2013) Radium Girls (Fall 2014), Madwoman of Chaillot (Spring 2015), The Trojan Women (Fall 2015), Julius Caesar (Spring 2016), Blue Stockings (Fall 2016), Our Town (Spring 2017), Afflicted: Daughters of Salem (Fall, 2017), This Girl Laughs, This Girl Cries, This Girl Does Nothing (Spring 2018) Peter and the Starcatcher (Fall 2018), Decision Point (Spring 2019), Macbeth (Fall, 2019), and Under Milkwood (Spring, 2020). SEM girls participate in the English Speaking Union's National Shakespeare Competition and often are the regional winners who go on to compete in NYC. Since 2017 SEM has participated in the Annual August Wilson Monologue Competition and is the only non-public school amongst the Western NY competitors.

Graduation: SEM graduates its seniors at Westminster Presbyterian Church. Graduates wear long, white dresses and carry bouquets of long-stemmed red roses. The graduation speaker is usually a SEM alumna. In 2013 it was Gwen Yates Little, an Academy Award nominated sound editor; in 2014 it was Nicole C. Lee '94, a human rights lawyer and immediate past president of the venerable nonprofit TransAfrica, she was also its first female president; in 2017 it was Dr. Virginia Horvath '75, Chancellor of SUNY Fredonia; in 2018 it was Naima Pearce '05, a producer for Meet the Press Daily.

Curriculum Director for the West Des Moines Community Schools District, Dr. Phyllis Mary Roberts Staplin, namesake of the Staplin Performing Arts Center, 2015, Arts Advocat;  nominated Valley High School to earn the first National GRAMMY Signaturer School Award, 1999. 1956 SEM Graduate. 
Journalist and Zonta International founder Marian de Forest
Feminist cartoonist Isabella Bannerman
author Lauren Belfer
singer/songwriter Amber Simone Chinn
writer Elizabeth Coatsworth
fashion designer Mara Hoffman
screenwriter Amy Holden Jones
writer, director, producer, singer/songwriter Maddie Larkin
human rights lawyer Nicole Lee
Journalist and lecturer Jane Meade Welch
author Roberta Rich
SUNY Fredonia recent past President [Dr. Virginia Shaefer Horvath]
playwright Elizabeth Swados
fundraiser Sarah Stoklosa
Women's Olympic basketball team and Stanford women's basketball coach Tara Vanderveer
Law professor and broadcaster Kimberly L. Wehle
Film sound editor Gwendolyn Yates Little
Sports and lifestyle television producer Susan Hunt
Author, editor, librettist, and translator Helen Tretbar
Artist Nan Watson

Cultural references 
In City of Light by Lauren Belfer, a novel exploring the cultural mores of old Buffalo wealth, Buffalo Seminary serves as inspiration for the Macaulay School for Girls, of which the main character is headmistress. Lauren Belfer is herself a graduate of the SEM.

See also 
Female seminary
Nichols School
Nardin Academy
The Park School of Buffalo

Gallery

See also
National Register of Historic Places listings in Buffalo, New York

References 

"From Johnson Park to Bidwell Parkway and Beyond: A Short History of Buffalo Seminary" by Gwen Ito. Western New York Heritage Magazine.

External links

 School Website
 The Association of Boarding Schools profile
 Association of Independent Schools

Girls' schools in New York (state)
School buildings on the National Register of Historic Places in New York (state)
1851 establishments in New York (state)
Schools in Buffalo, New York
Private high schools in New York (state)
Boarding schools in New York (state)
National Register of Historic Places in Buffalo, New York